Durbar can refer to:
 Conference of Rulers, a council of Malay monarchs
 Durbar festival, a yearly festival in several towns of Nigeria
 Durbar floor plate, a hot-rolled structural steel that has been designed to give excellent slip resistance on its upper surface
 Durbar Mahila Samanwaya Committee, an Indian non-governmental organisation for sex workers
 Durbar (court), a historical Mughal court in India; also used for a ceremonial gathering under the British Raj
 Delhi Durbar, assemblies in Delhi, India, to mark the succession of an Emperor or Empress of India under the British Raj
 Durbar (horse), a French racehorse, winner of the 1914 Epsom Derby
 Durbar (title), a title of honour in princely India
 Durbar Square